Christy Walsh may refer to:

 Christy Walsh (basketball), Irish basketball player
 Christy Walsh (hurler), Irish sportsperson
 Christy Walsh (sports agent), American businessman
 Christy Walsh case, Belfast man wrongly convicted of possession of explosives

See also
Christopher Walsh (disambiguation)
Christie Welsh (born 1981), American soccer player
Christine Welsh (disambiguation)